Hisham Abdulqader Abdulla, (born December 30, 1976 in Muharraq) is a Bahraini coach and a former professional volleyball player. He is best known for his international career representing Bahrain in the youth, and junior championships during his early days winning many trophies through the 1990s. He was the captain of Busaiteen Club which he helped getting their first championship in their history.

Hisham is married and has two children. He lives in Busaiteen.

References
Hisham Abdulla
News Retrieved August 14, 2007.

1976 births
Living people
Bahraini men's volleyball players